The Communist League of West Germany (Kommunistischer Bund Westdeutschland; KBW) was a Maoist organization in West Germany which existed from 1973 until 1985. The KBW contested the general elections in 1976 and 1980 in West Germany and was rated as the strongest of the German Maoist parties from 1974 until 1981. After 1982 the KBW was virtually inactive and was finally dissolved completely in 1985.

History 

The KBW was formed at a conference held in Bremen in June 1973 as a fusion of various local communist groups from  Heidelberg, Bremen, Göttingen, Freiburg etc. At its inaugural conference the KBW adopted a programme advocating the revolutionary overthrow of capitalism and the bourgeois state and the establishment of the dictatorship of the proletariat in order to achieve a classless society and communism. In its programme the KBW demanded the arming of the people (”Allgemeine Volksbewaffnung“).

One of the main efforts of the KBW was the struggle against the Bundeswehr (Federal Armed Forces). It organized youth camps dedicated to ideological and practical training for the revolutionary struggle. Members of the KBW participated in violent demonstrations against nuclear power plants in West Germany (Brokdorf, Grohnde).

On September 21, 1975 the KBW and his Committees against § 218 organized a demonstration of 25,000 people in Bonn against the German law prohibiting abortion.

The KBW contested the general elections in 1976 and 1980 and several state (German Bundesland) and local elections. The organization obtained 20,018 votes or 0,1% in the 1976 elections (8,285 votes 1980). It won one seat in the Heidelberg city council in 1975 which was lost later. Strongholds of the KBW were university towns.

The KBW headquarters moved from Mannheim to Frankfurt am Main in April 1977. When the Minister-President of Lower Saxony, Ernst Albrecht, proposed a ban on three maoist groups in 1977, KBW, the maoist Kommunistische Partei Deutschlands (KPD/AO) and the Communist Party of Germany/Marxist-Leninist (KPD/ML) demonstrated together in Bonn with about 16,000 supporters. 

The Zimbabwe African National Union (ZANU) was supported in its armed struggle by contributions from the KBW. ZANU politicians Ndabaningi Sithole, Robert Mugabe and Edgar Tekere visited West Germany several times at invitation of the KBW.

The organization split in the summer of 1980 when about a quarter of the membership formed the League of West German Communists (Bund Westdeutscher Kommunisten; BWK), which continued to work on the basis of the KBW programme of 1973.

In 1982 the KBW abandoned its objective of establishing the dictatorship of the proletariat and started to infiltrate The Greens (Die Grünen).  
The official weekly KVZ and the theoretical organ KuK ceased publication at the end of 1982. Their successor, the monthly Kommune was not a KBW magazine anymore.

Structure 
The organizational principle of the KBW was democratic centralism.
Since 1977 the organization was divided into three regional (Nord, Mitte, Süd) and 40 district units. It had in the beginning a 13-member (later expanded) Central Committee and a five-member Standing Committee (Ständiger Ausschuss).

The KBW had 900 members in 1973 and about 5,000 (with affiliated organizations) in 1977. Membership declined later due to the high demands the party made on their members, lack of success and the dramatic changes in the politics of the People's Republic of China.

Secretary of the Central Committee's Standing Committee from 1973 until 1982 was Joscha Schmierer.

Activity 
For a KBW activist a normal week looked as follows: Monday from 5.30am-7.30am the selling of the weekly Communist Peoples Newspaper (KVZ) in front of a factory gate or at the railway station, followed by a branch meeting on Monday evening. Tuesday started early again with KVZ sales, as did Wednesday. On Wednesday evening there was usually a training course based on an article from the theoretical organ "Communism and Class Struggle". On Saturday there was various public activity (mostly information stands with newspaper sales), and the whole of Sunday was devoted to the study of Marxist-Leninist classics. On free afternoons leaflets were distributed and more extensive training courses took place.

Electoral work 
The KBW also took part in elections. In general elections, the KBW only got around 0.1 percent of the votes. More important was the actual number of people voting for the KBW (20,018). This gave a relative good indication of how many people of the time actually approved of the violent overthrow of the capitalist system . Other smaller revolutionary parties also got about 25,000 votes at this time (1976).

The KBW had its biggest success in the communal elections of Baden-Württemberg in April 1975, when Helga Rosenbaum was voted onto the Heidelberg city council and used this as a platform to call for the violent overthrow of the Federal Republic. On September 16, 1976 she was expelled from this body by a vote of the majority parties.

Finances 
Contrary to most political parties, KBW had no major financial problems, with KVZ and other publications giving the party a healthy income. Another important factor was financial contributions from party members. There were no set party dues as such, rather, in each cell it was specified, what the individual member had to pay. Members in employment generally contributed one-third of their income. Added to that were the various donations that came in. Individual members brought in entire fortunes and inheritances. In the mid-1970s annual contributions and donations amounted to around 5 million DM and the income from the sales of the various publications was a further 2 million DM.

Orientation 
The KBW subscribed to the ideas of Karl Marx, Friedrich Engels, Vladimir Lenin, Joseph Stalin and Mao Zedong, whose writings were distributed through KBW bookshops (or later party offices). It sided with the politics of the Communist Party of China until 1980. Condolences  and greetings of KBW secretary Hans-Gerhart "Joscha" Schmierer were published frequently since 1976 in the Peking Review (later Beijing Review). It sent delegations to China several times and to the Democratic Kampuchea of Pol Pot in late 1978.

Party slogan 
Vorwärts im Kampf für die Rechte der Arbeiterklasse und des Volkes - Vorwärts im Kampf für den Sieg des Sozialismus (Forward in the struggle for the rights of the working class and the people - Forward in the struggle for the victory of socialism)

Affiliated organizations 
 Gesellschaft zur Unterstützung der Volkskämpfe, (GUV), (Society for Support of People's Struggles) for intellectuals
 Komitees und Initiativen gegen den § 218 (Committees against the [German abortion law] § 218)
 Kommunistische Hochschulgruppe (KHG), Kommunistischer Studentenbund (KSB) for university students
 Kommunistischer Jugendbund (KJB), the 1976 merger of Kommunistische Schülergruppe (KSG), Kommunistischer Oberschülerbund (KOB) and Kommunistischer Arbeiterjugendbund (KAJB), for young people
 Soldaten- und Reservisten Komitees (SRK), (Soldiers' and Reservists' Committees) for the antimilitaristic struggle
 Vereinigung für revolutionäre Volksbildung - Soldaten und Reservisten (Association of revolutionary People's education - Soldiers and Reservists) was the 1979 merger of GUV, § 218 Komitees and SRK following the substantial membership losses in the auxiliary organizations of the KBW

Publications 
 Kommunistische Volkszeitung [Communist Peoples Newspaper], KVZ, 1973, July — 1982, biweekly, later weekly official organ of KBW central committee
 Kommunismus und Klassenkampf [Communism and Class Struggle], KuK, 1972 — 1982, monthly theoretical organ
 Kommune, 1983, January ff., monthly (individual editors)
 Programme of the Kommunistischer Bund Westdeutschland, Mannheim 1975 (English translation of Programm und Statut des Kommunistischen Bundes Westdeutschland, 1973)

Former members of the KBW 
 Jörg Baberowski
 Reinhard Bütikofer
 Ralf Fücks
 Winfried Kretschmann
 Winfried Nachtwei
 Frieder Nake
 Sven Regener
 Ulla Schmidt
 Joscha Schmierer

Literature 
 Verfassungsschutzbericht, issues 1973 until 1985
 Yearbook on International Communist Affairs, ed. by Hoover Institution, 1973 ff.
 Political parties of the world; Compiled and edited by Alan J. Day and Henry W. Degenhardt, Harlow: Longman, 1980 (p. 126)
 Ulrich Probst: The communist parties in the Federal Republic of Germany, Frankfurt/Main: Haag + Herchen, 1981 (German: Die kommunistischen Parteien in der Bundesrepublik Deutschland)) 
 Communist and Marxist parties of the world; comp. and written by Charles Hobday, Harlow: Longman, 1986 (pp. 71–72)
 Robert J. Alexander: Maoism in the developed world; Westport, Conn.: Praeger, 2001 (pp. 84–86)

References

1973 establishments in Germany
1985 disestablishments in Germany
Anti-revisionist organizations
Defunct organisations based in Germany
Maoist organisations in Germany
Organizations disestablished in 1985
Organizations established in 1973